Kidron is a census-designated place in southwestern Sugar Creek Township, Wayne County, Ohio, United States.

History
Kidron was originally settled in 1819 by a group of Swiss Mennonites wishing to escape religious persecution and poor farming conditions in their homeland in the Sonnenberg area of Switzerland near the Jura Mountains. In Switzerland, the Swiss Mennonites were referred to as "Die Stillen im Lande" meaning "the quiet people in the country." They originally named their new home Sonnenberg, but later this gave way to the present day name of Kidron.

Education
Residents may attend a small public school in the nearby village of Dalton. The Kidron Elementary School was recently torn down (2014), however a new school building (in Dalton) for kindergarten through 8th grade was just built and used in the 2014–2015 school year.
Central Christian School is a private K–12 school located in Kidron, and is owned and operated by the Ohio Conference of the Mennonite Church.

Arts and culture

It is home to an outdoor flea market held Thursdays and Saturdays, weather permitting, and, since 1929, a retail store called Kidron Town and Country, which includes a grocery store, restaurant, butcher's shop, pharmacy, and dry goods. Because Kidron is unincorporated, police protection is the responsibility of the Wayne County Sheriff's Department.

Kidron attracts many of its visitors for its diverse tool shops, especially Lehman's Hardware, which sells Amish-made goods and serves a wide range of customers from local Amish to tourists from around the world.

There is an underground water spring in Kidron, and a protected forest is located nearby.  Surrounding countryside is largely used for farming.

A public museum is located in Kidron at the Kidron Sonnenberg Heritage Center. Besides displays of local historic items, the museum includes a library and a database of genealogical information for research, particularly related to those of Swiss heritage and Amish or Mennonite background that settled in the Kidron area in the early 19th century. The museum is operated by the non-profit Kidron Community Historical Society.

In addition to operating the museum, the Kidron Community Historical Society is developing a cultural heritage project named Sonnenberg Village, that will demonstrate Mennonite life and culture in the 19th century. Being built in Kidron on a five-acre tract of land, Sonnenberg Village will consist of historical buildings from the time period, and a Welcome Center for which the State of Ohio appropriated $200,000 for its construction.

In popular culture
On an episode of the Fox T.V. series 24 that aired on January 26, 2009, a city named "Kidron, Ohio" was the location of a foiled terrorist attack. The city depicted in the show was many times larger than the actual Kidron; its name was chosen because of its obscurity.

Notable people
Ron Amstutz, Ohio State Senator

References

External links
Kidron, Ohio Profile
Central Christian School
Kidron Community Historical Society

Unincorporated communities in Wayne County, Ohio
Unincorporated communities in Ohio
Amish in Ohio
Populated places established in 1819
Swiss-American culture in Ohio
1819 establishments in Ohio